The Women's 87 kg weightlifting competitions at the 2020 Summer Olympics in Tokyo took place on 2 August at the Tokyo International Forum.

Records

Results

References

Weightlifting at the 2020 Summer Olympics
Olymp
Women's events at the 2020 Summer Olympics